Petr Korda (born 23 January 1968) is a Czech former professional tennis player. He won the 1998 Australian Open and was runner-up at the 1992 French Open, reaching a career-high ranking of No. 2 in February 1998. Korda tested positive for doping in July 1998 at Wimbledon, and was banned from September 1999 for 12 months, but he retired shortly before the ban.

Tennis career

Juniors
He first came to the tennis world's attention as a promising junior player. In 1985, he partnered with fellow Czech Cyril Suk to win the boys' doubles title at the French Open. Korda and Suk ranked the joint-World No. 1 junior doubles players that year.

Junior Slam results:
Australian Open: -
French Open: 3R (1986)
Wimbledon: QF (1986)
US Open: QF (1986)

Professional career
Korda turned professional in 1987. He won his first career doubles title in 1988, and his first top-level singles title in 1991. Korda was involved in four Grand Slam finals during his career – two in singles and two in doubles. Korda also was known for the "Scissors Kick" which he would do at midcourt after winning matches.

In 1990, Korda and Goran Ivanišević finished runners-up in the men's doubles at the French Open, and as a result, Korda reached his career-high doubles ranking of world No. 10.
In 1992, he rose to the men's singles final at the French Open beating Christian Bergström, Shuzo Matsuoka, Michiel Schapers, Jaime Oncins, Andrei Cherkasov and Henri Leconte, before he was defeated in straight sets by defending champion Jim Courier 7–5, 6–2, 6–1.

A highlight of Korda's career include winning the Grand Slam Cup in 1993, with five-set wins in the semifinal and final over Pete Sampras and Michael Stich, the number 1 and 2 tennis players in the world at that time. Korda also was a part of the Czech Republic's team which won the Hopman Cup in 1994. In 1996 he teamed-up with Stefan Edberg to win the men's doubles title at the Australian Open. He also upset the defending champion, Pete Sampras, in five sets in the fourth round of the 1997 US Open.

The crowning moment of Korda's career came in 1998, when he defeated Albert Portas, Scott Draper, Vincent Spadea, Cédric Pioline, Jonas Björkman and Karol Kučera to face Marcelo Ríos in the men's singles final at the Australian Open. Korda dominated the match from start to finish by winning in straight sets 6–2, 6–2, 6–2 and claimed his first Grand Slam singles title in just 1 hour and 25 minutes. The win propelled him to his career-high singles ranking of World No. 2. At four tournaments in 1998, Korda had the world No. 1 ranking in his sights, but he lost to Karol Kučera in Antwerp, Marcelo Ríos at Indian Wells, Tim Henman in Miami and Richard Krajicek in Monte Carlo.

Suspension and retirement 
Following his quarterfinal match against Tim Henman at the Wimbledon 1998, Korda tested positive for the banned steroid nandrolone. This came to light in December 1998 when the appeals board of the International Tennis Federation (ITF) accepted his denial of intent and agreed not to ban him, instead merely withholding his Wimbledon prize money and ranking points. The ensuing controversy caused the ITF to launch an appeal against its own decision at the Court of Arbitration for Sport (CAS). In January 1999 Korda obtained a ruling in the High Court of England and Wales that the ITF could not appeal, but the High Court ruling was overturned by the Court of Appeal. In July 1999 the CAS allowed the ITF appeal and on 1 September 1999 the ITF banned Korda for 12 months and stripped him of all prize money and ranking points since the failed test. 

Before the ban, Korda had already announced his retirement, after losing to Danny Sapsford and failing to qualify for Wimbledon 1999.  However, after his ban he competed in Czech ATP Challenger Tour events:  the Prague Open (singles and doubles) in December 2000 and the Czech Open (doubles) in 2001 and 2005.

Personal life
Korda married Regina Rajchrtová, a former professional tennis player from Czechoslovakia. They have two daughters and a son. The oldest, Jessica, was born on 27 February 1993; she is a professional golfer, and finished 19th in the 2008 U.S. Women's Open as a 15-year-old, with Korda as her caddy.

At the 2013 U.S. Women's Open, Korda caddied for another one of his daughters, Nelly, who was 14 years old at the time and the youngest player in the tournament. As of March 2022, Nelly was the No.2 ranked woman golfer in the world and was previously ranked No. 1. Nelly won the gold medal in women's golf at the 2020 Summer Olympics (staged in Tokyo in 2021).

Korda's son, Sebastian, is a tennis player representing the United States and became the top-ranked junior in the world after winning the junior boys' Australian Open title in 2018.

Grand Slam finals

Singles: 2 (1 title, 1 runner-up)

Doubles: 2 (1 title, 1 runner-up)

Other significant finals

Grand Slam Cup

Singles: 1 (1–0)

Masters Series finals

Singles: 3 (1–2)

Doubles: 4 (3–1)===

ATP career finals

Singles: 27 (10 titles, 17 runners-up)

Doubles: 24 (10 titles, 14 runners-up)

Performance timelines

Singles 

1 Held as Stockholm Masters until 1994, Stuttgart Masters from 1995 to 2001.

Doubles

1 Held as Stockholm Masters until 1994, Stuttgart Masters from 1995 to 2001.

Top 10 wins

References

External links
 
 
 
 Sunday Times article 30 August, 2009

1968 births
Living people
Australian Open (tennis) champions
Czech expatriate sportspeople in Monaco
Czech male tennis players
Czech sportspeople in doping cases
Czechoslovak male tennis players
Doping cases in tennis
French Open junior champions
Hopman Cup competitors
People from Monte Carlo
Tennis players from Prague
Wimbledon junior champions
Grand Slam (tennis) champions in men's singles
Grand Slam (tennis) champions in men's doubles
Grand Slam (tennis) champions in boys' doubles
Masters tennis players
Czech emigrants to the United States